is a Japanese actor and voice actor represented by Awesome Inc. His debut acting roles were as Reira in the live adaptation of the manga Fuuma no Kojirou and his first main role was in the musical Saiyuki where he played the role of Genjyo Sanzo. He guest starred in Kamen Rider Decade as Kazuma Kendate/Kamen Rider Blade. He is best known for his role as Mikazuki Munechika in the stage plays of Touken Ranbu. At the end of July 2011 he left the modelling agency Junes Corporation and from 2012 he joined Awesome Inc.

Filmography

Anime television

Television

Movies
Kamen Rider x Kamen Rider W & Kamen Rider Decade Movie Great War 2010 (2009) - Kendate Kazuma/ Kamen Rider Blade
 Fun way of writing light novels (2010) - Ishikiri Kiyomaru
 Destiny - enishi (2011) - Jun
 Go! Male High School Theater Department (2011) - Hyoshitsu
 Youth discovery film - always youth edition - Burial shop Mochizuki (2015) - Mochizuki Koji
 Youth discovery film - always youth edition - My human defects (2016)
 Remember me (2018) - Resident of the land of the dead/The man with a corn (voices)
 Touken Ranbu (2019) - Mikazuki Munechika
 Stolen Identity 2 (2020)
 Shinigamizukai no jikenjo (2020) - Kusaka Genshiro

Stage Play

2008
 Fuuma no Kojiro (2008) - Reira
 Musical "Gakuen Heaven BOY'S LOVE SCRAMBLE!~ Bell Liberty ★ Prince ~" (2008) - Saionji Kaoru
 Saiyuki Kagekiden - Go to the West - (2008) - Genjyo Sanzo
 30-DELUX The Eighth Live "Familia" (2008) - Kamura
 Afro13 "Death of Samurai" (2008) - Izuna

2009
 Saiyuuki Kagekiden - Dead or alive - (2009) - Genjyo Sanzo
 Ludovic★Vol.4 "Little Alice - The timetable of a boy named Alice" (2009) - Griffon
 Dramatic Review - L`OPÉRA FRAGILE (2009) - Takeshi
 Good morning, uncle (2009) - Hanamura Takashi
 Shonen company "Romeo and Juliet" (2009) - Juliet
 Ludovic★Vol.5 "ROMEO ~Visitors at midnight~" (2009) - Jan
 Gekidan taishu shousestuka "BLUE SKY GRACE" (2009) - Shota
 Nano square ash head (2009) - Kagurazaka Isamu/ Cinderella

2010
 Be with Produce Recitation LOVE × LETTERS (2010) - Kaito/ Misora/ Daichi
 "White Tiger Force" the idol (2010) - Genichiro Hajime
 Ludovic★Vol.6 "HAMLET The kiss of a blue rose" (2010) - Klaus
 Opera Utakata (2010) - Takeshi
 Love, beyond time ~ The destiny of a far away space-time (2010) - Sakuramaru
 abc★ Akasaka Boys Cabaret - First part ~Kokoro goto nuge!~ (2010) - Furugoori Yasuyuki
 Gekidan VitaminX ~Legend of Vitamin~ (2010) - Fuumonji Goro
 Makai tensho (2010) - Date Sajuro
 EVE ~ Bystanders of history ~ 2012 (2010) - Special guest appearance

2011
 Hanasakeru Seishonen 〜The Budding Beauty in The Oriental Blue Wind〜 (2011) - Somand
 Hanaoni - Flower demon (2011) - Takatsuki Reiji
 THE BUTTERFLY EFFECT CHRONICLE "Blood Heaven 〜Seventh Heaven~" (2011) - Macaulay
 abc★ Akasaka Boys Cabaret - Second part ~ Katsu! & Katsu! (2011) - Furugoori Yasuyuki
 Love whispered me to kill (2011) - Tsuruta Seijiro
 Conton club ~ image5 ~ (2011)
 Gokujo Bungaku "In the Forest, Under Cherries in Full Bloom" (2011) - Reader (Princess Tsumiyori)
 My bakery in love (2011) - Tabata Fusanosuke

2012
 Stage play "Yowamushi pedal" (2012) - Yasutomo Arakita
 ASHES AND THE DIAMOND〜Sight of the darkness (2012) - Sapphire 
 THE BUTTERFLY EFFECT CHRONICLE "LABYRINTH" (2012) - Macaulay
 abc★ Akasaka Boys Cabaret - Third part - Jibun ni katsu wo irete katsu!~ (2012) - Furugoori Yasuyuki
 Shuwacchi! ~My aim is Prince of Tights~ (2012) - Matsudaira Tsukasa
 SAMURAI banka 2012 ~Boshu Bakumatsu version~ (2012) - Kenta
 The Tale of Genji x Oguro Maki songs ~ I fall in love with twelve (2012) - Koremitsu
 Ludovic★Vol.8 "Little Alice - The timetable of a boy named Alice" (2012) - Dyna
 A Study in Scarlet (2012) - Dr. Watson
 Reading play "Prayer" - A story about goodbye and new encounters in a cold night (2012)
 Reading play "First love" (2012)
 SAMURAI banka II ~ Kishuu's soul (2012) - Shichirobee
 Reading play "Tails' friends" Dog college (2012) - Genshiro (special guest appearance)
 Reading play "Christmas Carol" (2012)

2013
 Stage play "Yowamushi pedal - Hakone Academy Chapter ~ Sleeping Straight Line Demon" (2013) - Yasutomo Arakita
 Musical "Hakuouki" Okita Souji version (2013) - Nagumo Kaoru
 Tokyo eccentric fellow exposition (2013) - Kinoshita
 THE BUTTERFLY EFFECT CHRONICLE "Blood Heaven 〜Seventh Heaven〜" Sad wings (2013) - Macaulay
 Reading play "Ogata's lover - dancer" (2013)
 Music play 
 SAMURAI banka III ~Last Samurai code J.~ (2013) - Irie Souzaburou
 Stage play "Yowamushi pedal - Inter High Chapter ~ The First Result" (2013) - Yasutomo Arakita
 30-DELUX The Remake Theater "Destiny" (2013) - Rose
 Gokujo Bungaku "The Ascension of K, or K's Drowning" (2013) - Reader

2014
 Musical "Hakuouki" HAKU-MYU LIVE (2014) - Nagumo Kaoru
 Life of an amorous man (2014) - Enno Sho
 Saiyuki Kagekiden - God Child (2014) - Genjyo Sanzo
 Stage play "Yowamushi Pedal - Inter High Chapter ~ The Second Order" (2014) - Yasutomo Arakita
 Honky Tonk Blues Sleepless Nights Chapter 2 ~ Resurrection (2014) - Kakeru
 THE BUTTERFLY EFFECT CHRONICLE 〜Blood Heaven Final Tale〜 "Innocent World" (2014) - Macaulay
 Stage play "K" (2014) - Fushimi Saruhiko
 Margarita - The angels of Sengoku era (2014) - Nakaura Julian
 Stage play "Yowamushi pedal - Hakone Academy Chapter ~ The Beast's Awakening" (2014) - Yasutomo Arakita
 Reading play "My social status plan" (2014) - Alfred

2015
 Saiyuki Kagekiden - Burial (2015) - Genjyo Sanzo
 Stage play "Yowamushi Pedal -  Inter High Chapter ~ The WINNER" (2015) - Yasutomo Arakita
 The eraser in my head 7th letter (2015) - Kosuke
 Honky Tonk Blues Sleepless Nights Chapter 2 ~Leap (2015) - Kakeru
 Sengoku BASARA vs Devil May Cry (2015) - Dante
 Saiyuki Kagekiden - Reload (2015) - Genjyo Sanzo
 Maboroshi no shiro - Sengoku's beautiful madness (2015) - Ukita Hideie
 Super Danganronpa 2 THE STAGE - Goodbye Despair Academy (2015) - Komaeda Nagito
 Earth's Art Neoline Sacred Creation (2015) - Special guest appearance
 Stage play "Noragami - Kami to negai" (2015) - Yato

2016
 Boku no River-ru (2016) - Vincent van Gogh
 History Tame Live ~ first part (2016)
 Stage play "Touken Ranbu - Burning Honnouji" (2016) - Mikazuki Munechika
 Sin of Sleeping Snow (2016) - Yamagata Masakage
 Sannin kichisa (2016) - Ojoukichisa
 Honky Tonk Blues Sleepless Nights Chapter 2 - Miracle (2016) - Kakeru
 AZUMI - Sengoku version (2016) - Ukiha
 Stage play "Touken Ranbu - Burning Honnouji - Reprise" (2016) - Mikazuki Munechika

2017
 Stage play "Noragami - Kami to Kizuna" (2017) - Yato
 Super Danganronpa 2 THE STAGE 2017 - Komaeda Nagito
 Stage play "Touken Ranbu - Giden - Atatsuki no Dokuganryuu" (2017) - Mikazuki Munechika
 Honky Tonk Blues Sleepless Nights Chapter 3 - Awakening (2017) - Kakeru
 History Tame Live ~ second part (2017)
 Stage play "Rengoku ni Warau" (2017) - Ishida Sakichi
 Stage play "Touken Ranbu - Joden Mitsuraboshi Katana gatari" (2017) - Mikazuki Munechika (cameo)
 Seven Souls in the Skull Castle - Season Moon (2017-2018) - Tenmao

2018
 Reading stage "The eraser in my head" (2018) - Kosuke
 Stage play "Touken Ranbu - Hiden yui no me no hototogisu" (2018) - Mikazuki Munechika
 Recitated stage "Tomorrow I will date with yesterday's you" (2018) - Takatoshi Minamiyama
 "No. 9 - Immortal melody" (2018) - Nikolaus Johann Beethoven

2019
 Stage play "Dororo" (2019) - Hyakkimaru
 Stage play "Psycho-Pass" (2019) - Kusen Haruto
 Saiyuki Kagekiden - Darkness (2019) - Genjyo Sanzo
 Stage play Yu Yu Hakusho (2019) - Kurama

2020
 Musical Little Shop of Horrors (2020) - Seymour Krelborn
 Stage play "The Great War of Archimedes" (2020) - Tadashi Kai (cancelled due Covid-19)
 Stage play Tokiko-san no Toki (2020) - Shoma/Toki
 Stage play Yu Yu Hakusho - Sono ni (2020) - Kurama

2021
 Stage play "Touken Ranbu - Osaka Summer Campaign" (2021) - Mikazuki Munechika
 Bakuman THE STAGE (2021) - Mashiro Moritaka

TV programs

Web drama

Other works

CD
Original TV soundtrack "Fuuma no Kojiro" Music Collection (2007) - "Vermilion Flames" by Reira
Koko wa Greenwood - HERE IS GREENWOOD - Vocal Mini Album (2008) - "Kiseki moment" by Kisaragi Shun
Sengoku Nabe TV Music Tonight - Somehow I can learn history CD (2011) - "Atsumori 2011" by Nobunaga and Ranmaru
Sengoku Nabe TV Music Tonight - Somehow I can learn history CD second deporture (2013) - "Uchitainda" "Genroku Akoujiken" by AKR47 featuring Kira

Soft image
Watching only For Lady (2009)
Real Face Suzuki Hiroki (2014)

Photo album
Suzuki Hiroki's first album "SHAFT - Suzuki Hiroki Acting From Thirty" - (2016)

References

External links
鈴木拡樹/Hiroki Suzuki - Profile at [http://www.awesomes.co.jp/ Awesome Inc.]

鈴木拡樹Official Fan Club「HIROTOMO」
鈴木拡樹Official Blog「拡言 -KAKUGEN-」(Personal Blog on Ameba (April 2012~))
鈴木拡樹 on Twitter

1985 births
People from Sakai, Osaka
Living people
Japanese male actors